Charles Martin Castleman (born 22 May 1941) is an American violinist and teacher.

Born in Quincy, Massachusetts, he began violin lessons at the age of four with Ondricek. When he was six he appeared as a soloist with Arthur Fiedler and the Boston Pops Orch. At nine, he made his solo recital debuts at Jordan Hall in Boston and Town Hall in New York

In Aaron Richmond's Celebrity Series of 1950-51 he was co-featured with Mischa Elman, Jascha Heifetz and Isaac Stern. He was a student of Galamian at the Curtis Institute of Music in Philadelphia (1959–63), and also received coaching from Gingold, Szering and Oistrakh. He received AB and MA degrees from Harvard University and the University of Pennsylvania.

In 1963 he was a silver medalist at the Queen Elisabeth Concours in Brussels, and in 1966 was a bronze medalist at the Tchaikovsky Competition in Moscow. He debuted in 1963 with the Philadelphia Orchestra and Eugene Ormandy playing Wieniawski's F sharp minor Concerto. In 1964 he made his formal adult debut at New York’s Town Hall.

In 1970 he organized the Castleman Quartet Program, a workshop in solo and chamber music performances. It celebrated its 41st anniversary under his direction in 2010 in sessions at Fredonia, New York and Boulder, Colorado. From 1972 to 1975 he was a member of the New String Trio of New York, recording Reger and Frank Martin for BASF. In 1975 he became Professor of Violin at the Eastman School of Music in Rochester, New York where he was chair of the strings department for eight years.

He played in the Raphael Trio from 1975 to 2000, which made tours of the U.S. in a series of Haydn, Beethoven and Dvorak cycles. The trio played much contemporary music, including Bischof's Trio 89 at the Vienna Festival in 1989. On May 2, 1981, Castleman was soloist in the premiere of Amram's Violin Concerto with the St. Louis Symphony Orchestra under Slatkin's direction, later recording the work with Manhattan Chamber Orchestra for Newport Classic. On October 25 of that same year he performed all of Ysaye's 6 Sonatas for Solo Violin at New York’s Alice Tully Hall, and recorded them for Nonesuch/Music and Arts. In 2001 Cypres Records and the Queen Elisabeth Concours issued a retrospective CD set of the most outstanding performances in the history of the Concours; Castleman's rendition of Leon Jongen's Concerto was chosen as one of the seventeen most distinguished violin performances.

His engagements as a soloist have led to appearances with orchestras in Boston, Chicago, New York, Philadelphia, Mexico City, Moscow and elsewhere. He has also appeared at many festivals in the U.S. and abroad. As a teacher, he has presided over numerous master classes around the globe. He is the author of articles on Renaissance madrigals and violinist-composers. He performs on Stradivarius and Goffriller violins from 1709 and chooses from a collection of more than eighty bows.

References 

1941 births
Living people
American male violinists
Harvard University alumni
University of Pennsylvania alumni
21st-century American violinists
21st-century American male musicians